is an interchange passenger railway station located in Midori-ku, Yokohama, Kanagawa Prefecture, Japan, jointly operated by East Japan Railway Company (JR East), Tokyu Corporation, and the Yokohama Minatomirai Railway.

Lines
Many services continue west of Higashi-Kanagawa via the Negishi Line to  during the offpeak, and to  during the morning peak. In addition, Nagatsuta is the terminus of the Kodomonokuni Line operated by the Yokohama Minatomirai Railway.

Station layout
Nagatsuta Station is where the express and local trains on the Den-en-toshi line cross. JR Nagatsuta and Tōkyū Nagatsuta use the same building.
JR Nagatsuta Station has a single island platform serving two elevated tracks. The station has a Midori no Madoguchi staffed ticket office. Tōkyū Nagatsuta Station has two island platforms serving four elevated tracks. The Kodomonokuni Line has a single side platform.

Platforms

History
Nagatsuta Station was opened on 23 September 1908.

Station numbering was introduced to the Yokohama Line on 20 August 2016 with Nagatsuta being assigned station number JH21.

Passenger statistics
In fiscal 2019, the JR station was used by an average of 61,184 passengers daily (boarding passengers only). During the period, the Tokyu station was used by an average of 70,605 passengers daily.

The daily average passenger figures (boarding passengers only) for previous years are as shown below.

Surrounding area
Yokohama City Midori Ward Cultural Center (Midori Art Park) [22]
 Nagatsuta District Center
 Minami Nagatsuda housing complex
 Nagatsuta housing complex
Nagatsuta Kosei General Hospital
Yokohama City Nagatsuta Elementary School

See also
 List of railway stations in Japan

References

External links

 Nagatsuta Station information (JR East) 
Nagatsuta Station information (Tokyu) 

Railway stations in Kanagawa Prefecture
Railway stations in Japan opened in 1908
Railway stations in Yokohama
Yokohama Line